General elections were held in Monaco on 9 January 1983. The result was a victory for the National and Democratic Union, which won all 18 seats in the National Council.

Results

By party

References

Elections in Monaco
Monaco
1983 in Monaco
January 1983 events in Europe